Gábor Mátray (23 November 1797, in Nagykata – 17 July 1875, in Budapest) was a Hungarian librarian and composer.

Mátray was a librarian at the Hungarian National Museum in Budapest from 1847 to 1874. He distinguished himself as a collector and recorder of Hungarian folk songs, and as the founder of the Music Conservatory in Budapest (1840).

External links

 Biography and works of Gábor Mátray
 

Hungarian composers
Hungarian male composers
Hungarian librarians
1797 births
1875 deaths
Burials at Kerepesi Cemetery
19th-century male musicians